William Gay Main (30 November 1915 – 18 May 1969) was a Scottish professional footballer who played as a wing half. He made six appearances in the Football League for Cardiff City.

Career
Main began his senior career with Raith Rovers. In December 1936, he joined Football League Third Division South side Cardiff City and made his debut on Christmas Day of the same year in a defeat to Torquay United. He struggled to establish himself in the first team, making five further league appearances in the following two seasons. He left Cardiff to join Colchester United in 1939 and played in the club's opening three fixtures of the 1939–40 season before the league was suspended following the outbreak of World War II.

References

1915 births
1969 deaths
Scottish footballers
Raith Rovers F.C. players
Cardiff City F.C. players
Colchester United F.C. players
English Football League players
Association football wing halves